Bob D'Amico is an American drummer. He is best known as the drummer for indie rock bands The Fiery Furnaces and Sebadoh.

Discography

With Set On Stun 
Studio albums
  Reveals the Shocking Truth... CD (1998, Distance Formula Recordings)

With The Fiery Furnaces 
Studio albums
 Widow City CD/2xLP/Digital (October 9, 2007, Thrill Jockey)
 I'm Going Away CD/LP/Digital (July 21, 2009, Thrill Jockey)
Live albums
 Remember 2xCD/3xLP/Digital (August 19, 2008, Thrill Jockey)
Singles
 The End is Near LP (July 24, 2009, Thrill Jockey)

With Lou Reed 
 "Peggy Sue"  Rave On Buddy Holly CD/LP (June 28, 2011, Fantasy Records/Concord Music Group)

With Sebadoh 
Studio albums
 Defend Yourself CD/LP/Cassette/Digital (September 16, 2013, Joyful Noise/Domino)
 Act Surprised CD/LP/Digital (May 24, 2019, Dangerbird Records/Fire Records)
EPs
 Secret EP CD/LP/Digital (July 23, 2012, Self-released/Joyful Noise)

With Saqqara Mastabas 
Studio albums
 Libras CD/LP (June 3, 2016, Joyful Noise)

References

American rock drummers
Indie rock drummers
The Fiery Furnaces members
Sebadoh members
Living people
1969 births
20th-century American drummers
American male drummers